The New York State Police (NYSP) is the state police of the state of New York in the United States. It is part of the New York State Executive Department, and employs over 5,000 sworn state troopers and 711 civilian members.

History

Like most States, the State of New York did not establish a state police force until the early twentieth century. In part this reflected the pattern of settlement across a wide frontier. A number of proposals to create such a force during the early 1900s, but faced considerable opposition from trade union interests. They feared the police would be used against union organizing, as was happening in several other states.

Following the 1913 murder of Sam Howell, a construction foreman in Westchester County, and failure of the local police to arrest suspects he had named before his death, the New York State Legislature passed a bill to establish a state police force. The New York State Police was officially established on April 11, 1917.

The division's first superintendent was George Fletcher Chandler, who was appointed by Governor Charles S. Whitman. Chandler is credited with much of the division's early organization and development. Chandler coined the term "New York State Troopers." He was an early advocate of officers carrying their weapons exposed on a belt, which was not common practice at the time.

On January 1, 1980, the Long Island State Parkway Police merged with the state police; this resulted in the official establishment of Troop L. In October 1997, the New York State Capital Police was consolidated and absorbed into the state police.

Since February 1994, the agency has accepted DNA evidence for forensic investigation and analysis. The New York State Police Forensic Investigation Center (FIC) opened in November 1996. The Crime Laboratory performs DNA analysis for state investigations and for local law enforcement. It includes a new DNA Data Bank Section that compiles DNA records from violent felons sentenced to prison in New York State. These records can be searched and compared by computer to other evidence collected in unsolved crimes.

In December 2019, Governor Andrew Cuomo announced that the New York State Park Police was to be merged with the New York State Police. The merger was expected to take about six months. However, in January 2022, New York officials announced that the two police forces would remain separate. 

Since the establishment of the New York State Police, 140 troopers have died while on duty.

Structure and organization

The NYSP divides New York state geographically into eleven "Troops," each comprising a specific geographic area, usually several counties.  Each is supervised by a "Troop Commander" usually of the rank of Major.  NYSP Troops cover the following counties and regions as listed:

Each Troop encompasses 2–4 "Zones" which are referred to simply by a Zone number. There are up to several "sub-stations" located within each zone.

Uniforms
Trooper uniforms are made of grey wool, with the exception of the Gore-Tex jacket. Prior to 1958, uniforms (shirts, jackets and britches) were woven of equal parts white fiber and black fiber to symbolize the impartiality of justice. The NYSP do not wear a badge on their uniform shirts.

Equipment 
As of January 2018, New York State Troopers are issued the Glock 21 Gen 4 .45 ACP handgun as their service pistol. New York State Troopers previously used the Glock 37 .45 GAP handgun from 2007 to 2018. The New York State Police used the Glock 17 9mm handgun from 1990 to 2007, the Glock 17 replaced the Smith & Wesson Model 686 (NYSP issued the Model 681).

The New York State Police is one of only five state police agencies in the United States that, as of 2019, does not equip its state police vehicles with dashboard cameras. New York State Troopers starting on April 5, 2021 have started receiving body-worn cameras.

Aviation 
The New York State Police has three Bell 407 single engine utility helicopters, six Bell 430 twin engine helicopters, three Bell UH-1 “HUEY 2” Single engine utility helicopters and one UH-1H “HUEY 1” Single engine utility helicopter. Their other aircraft are two Cessna 206 Stationair Single engine airplanes, one Cessna 172 Single engine airplane, one Partenavia 68 Twin engine observation airplane, one Sikorsky S-76 (used for transporting the governor), and two Beech King Air twin engine turboprop airplanes. All of these aircraft operate under the call sign “GrayRider”.

See also

New York State Police Troop C scandal
 List of law enforcement agencies in New York
New York State University Police
State Police (United States)
Highway Patrol

Notes

References

External links
New York State Police website
In-depth NYSP history
 New York State Police in the New York Codes, Rules and Regulations
NYSP Recruitment Center website
Union representing Troopers and Supervisors
Union representing Investigators

State law enforcement agencies of New York (state)
1917 establishments in New York (state)
Government agencies established in 1917